The SZD-14X Jaskółka M was a single-seat glider designed and built in Poland at Szybowcowy Zakład Doświadczalny - Glider Experimental Works in Bielsko-Biała in 1954. This was an experimental prototype, and only one unit was constructed.

Development
The SZD-14X Jaskółka M was developed from the SZD-8bis Jaskółka (Swallow) for research into the construction, control and characteristics of 'V' or butterfly tail surfaces. Using the airframe of the second prototype SZD-8 a 'V' tail was added to the rear fuselage, with arrangements for the balance of the surfaces and the angle between them to be adjusted as required. The designer was Tadeusz Kostia, the constructor was Władysław Okarmus.

First flown by Adam Zientek at Bielsko on 23 July 1954, the SZD-14 was found to be easy to fly with no vices, giving no indication that the tail layout was unconventional. During spinning tests the rear fuselage was almost torn off, but the pilot (Dziurzyński) managed to regain control and recovered the aircraft to land safely.

Up to the time of the SZD-14's debut, the 'V' tail system was rare, with few aircraft using the system devised by Eng. Jerzy Rudlicki and demonstrated on a licence-built Hanriot HD.14 biplane in the early 1930s.

Specifications (SZD-14x Jaskółka M)

See also

References

Taylor, J. H. (ed) (1989) Jane's Encyclopedia of Aviation. Studio Editions: London. p. 29
Cynk, Jerzy B.. “Polish Aircraft 1893–1939”. London, Putnam. 1971. 
Simons, Martin. Sailplanes 1945-1965 2nd revised edition. EQIP Werbung und Verlag G.m.b.H.. Königswinter. 2006. 
 Babiejczuk, Janusz and Grzegorzewski, Jerzy. Polski przemysł lotniczy 1945-1973 [Polish aerospace industry 1945-1973]. Warsaw: Wydawnictwo MON, 1974

External links

http://www.piotrp.de/SZYBOWCE/pszd14.htm

1950s Polish sailplanes
SZD aircraft
Aircraft first flown in 1954
V-tail aircraft